Corey Gault (born 28 October 1992) is a former professional Australian rules footballer who played for the Collingwood Football Club in the Australian Football League (AFL).

He made his debut for Collingwood against Hawthorn in round 23 of the 2014 AFL season. Gault was delisted at the end of 2013 season but was given another chance and re-drafted to the rookie list via the 2014 AFL Rookie Draft. Standing at 199 cm and 96 kg Gault is a tall forward.

In October 2016, Gault retired from AFL level football to return home to Western Australia and re-joined Swan Districts. He represented Western Australia in the interstate match against South Australia in 2021.

Statistics

|- style="background-color: #eaeaea"
! scope="row" style="text-align:center" | 2012
|  || 44 || 0 || — || — || — || — || — || — || — || — || — || — || — || — || — || —
|- 
! scope="row" style="text-align:center" | 2013
|  || 44 || 0 || — || — || — || — || — || — || — || — || — || — || — || — || — || —
|- style="background-color: #eaeaea"
! scope="row" style="text-align:center" | 2014
|  || 44 || 1 || 2 || 0 || 6 || 1 || 7 || 3 || 4 || 2.0 || 0.0 || 6.0 || 1.0 || 7.0 || 3.0 || 4.0
|- 
! scope="row" style="text-align:center" | 2015
|  || 44 || 3 || 2 || 1 || 13 || 13 || 26 || 5 || 5 || 0.7 || 0.3 || 4.3 || 4.3 || 8.7 || 1.7 || 1.7
|- style="background-color: #eaeaea"
! scope="row" style="text-align:center" | 2016
|  || 44 || 2 || 0 || 0 || 6 || 5 || 11 || 2 || 6 || 0.0 || 0.0 || 3.0 || 2.5 || 5.5 || 1.0 || 3.0
|- class="sortbottom"
! colspan=3| Career
! 6
! 4
! 1
! 25
! 19
! 44
! 10
! 15
! 0.7
! 0.2
! 4.2
! 3.2
! 7.3
! 1.7
! 2.5
|}

References

External links

Living people
1992 births
Collingwood Football Club players
Swan Districts Football Club players
Australian rules footballers from Western Australia